Chaldean National Congress is an Iraqi political party that was found in 2002 in the United States with Dhia Putros being named the first secretary of the party. After 10 years, Putros quit his post in 2012 and accepted the position of chairman of Human Rights in Iraqi Kurdistan.

On August 31, 2017 on the ankawa.com website the US-based Chaldean National Congress strongly criticized an August 6 speech of the Chaldean Catholic Patriarch of Baghdad in which, according to an Agenzia Fides news description "Patriarch Louis Raphael had pointed out political parties and armed factions that claimed ties and tasks of representation with local Christian communities among the main perpetrators of the suffering and confusion that mark the present condition of Christian communities in Iraq". In response to the criticism the Patriarchate issued an official note critiquing what it called CNC's "unrealistic" issue positions on the political future of the Nineveh Plains, asserting that the CNC had not contributed substantively to securing the decimated and vulnerable Christian presence there and suggesting "that some use the Chaldean name for personal interests.".

References

Assyrians in Iraq
Assyrian political parties
Political parties of minorities in Iraq